Agia Sofia is a village in the municipality of Tyrnavos. Before the 1997 local government reform it was a part of the community of Dendra. The 2011 census recorded 109 inhabitants in the village. Agia Sofia is a part of the local community of Dendra Tyrnavou.

Population
According to the 2011 census, the population of the settlement of Agia Sofia was 109 people, an increase of over 100% compared with the population of the previous census of 2001.

See also
 List of settlements in the Larissa regional unit

References

Populated places in Larissa (regional unit)
Tyrnavos